The 1923 Pottsville Maroons season was their 4th season in existence. The team played independently would go on to post a 7-3-2 record.

Schedule

Game notes

References
Pro Football Archives: 1923 Pottsville Maroons season

1923
Pottsville Maroons
Pottsville Mar